The Von Bondies are an American alternative rock band formed in 1997.

The original line-up formed at the 1997 Cramps/Guitar Wolf show by Jason Stollsteimer and Marcie Bolen. They went through a variety of member changes and band names, including The Baby Killers, before settling on The Von Bondies in 2000. Don Blum joined the band around 1999 after attending numerous Baby Killers shows, while Lauren Wilcox was picked via an audition. The Von Bondies got their break by playing a New Year's Eve show in Detroit, Michigan, in 2000. In attendance at the show was Long Gone John, owner of the Sympathy for the Record Industry label. This led to Sympathy releasing the band's debut album Lack of Communication in 2001.

In 2003, the band released the live Raw and Rare through Dim Mak Records, which was followed by their 2004 breakthrough release, Pawn Shoppe Heart, on Sire Records. Pawn Shoppe was produced by Jerry Harrison of Talking Heads and co-produced by Stollsteimer.

The album reached a peak of No. 36 in the UK Albums Chart, and No. 8 on Billboards Top Heatseekers chart and stayed in that chart for eight weeks. The hit single from this release was "C'mon C'mon", which reached No. 25 on the Billboard Alternative Songs chart and garnered national radio play. "C'mon C'mon" reached No. 21 and "Tell Me What You See" reached No. 43 on the UK Singles Chart.

A shortened version of "C'mon C'mon" was the theme song to the TV series Rescue Me and was performed live by the band in Michael Winterbottom's film 9 Songs. MLB Network also used a brief clip of the song as the opening of their show 30 Clubs in 30 Days from 2009 to 2012.

Alicia Gbur and Matt Lannoo of The Nice Device were touring members of the band from 2007-2008. In 2008, the band signed with indie label Majordomo Records, joining label mates The Airborne Toxic Event and Earlimart. Their label debut, Love, Hate and Then There's You, was released in February 2009 featuring the single "Pale Bride".

Known as a touring act, The Von Bondies have headlined tours of the United Kingdom/Europe, Australia, and the United States, taking along supporting bands like The Kills, Kasabian, Franz Ferdinand, Modey Lemon, SSM, The Subways, The Stills, Hot Panda and The Donnas. They have also appeared on Late Show with David Letterman, Last Call with Carson Daly and CD:UK.

The group disbanded in July 2011. Its lineup at the time was Jason Stollsteimer on vocals and lead guitar, Don Blum on drums, Christy Hunt on rhythm guitar, and Leann Banks on bass guitar.

They reformed in 2020 and planned a reunion tour, but those plans had to be abandoned due to the COVID-19 pandemic.

Biography

Early days
In 2000, Stollsteimer and  Marcie Bolen attended a concert by Japanese garage punk band Guitar Wolf. At the time, Stollsteimer was working a job as a bowling alley bartender and Marcie as a hairdresser. The performance spurred Stollsteimer to create his own band, The Baby Killers, which toured with fellow Detroit bands The Detroit Cobras, The Go and The White Stripes. After recruiting Lauren Wilcox on bass and Don Blum on drums the band changed their name to the Von Bondies.

While playing a handful of shows in the Detroit area, the quartet recorded singles "It Came from Japan", an ode to Guitar Wolf, and "Nite Train".

Lack of Communication (2001–2002)
Jack White produced the Von Bondies' debut album, Lack of Communication, in late 2001. It was recorded in three days. It was released in 2001 by Sympathy for the Record Industry, and in the UK by Sweet Nothing Records. The hidden bonus track was a cover of Sam Cooke's "Bring It On Home to Me", with Bolen on lead vocals. The band said this is the least expensive album they made.

Pawn Shoppe Heart (2003–2005)
The group relocated to a San Francisco recording studio in early 2002 with producer Jerry Harrison to begin work on Pawn Shoppe Heart.

Broken ties
On the evening of December 13, 2003, an altercation occurred between Stollsteimer and the White Stripes frontman Jack White during the record release party for the band Blanche at The Magic Stick (a Detroit music club and part of the Majestic Theater complex). Stollsteimer was treated for injuries at Detroit Receiving Hospital. Detroit police arrested White and the Wayne County prosecutor's office charged him with aggravated assault. White pleaded guilty to assault and a judge sentenced him to anger management classes.

Love, Hate and Then There's You (2009–2011)
The Von Bondies' third album is Love, Hate and Then There's You. It was released on February 3, 2009. They released a limited-edition 7-inch single of "Pale Bride" from the album, backed with the non-album song "Falling in Love".

The Von Bondies celebrated their ninth year together with this release. This was the first time that a Von Bondies release saw Don Blum co-write with Stollsteimer. Love, Hate was produced by Jason Stollsteimer, with three songs by Butch Walker and three songs by Rick Parker. All songs were written by Jason Stollsteimer, except "Blame Game" and "Earthquake", which were co-written by Stollsteimer and Blum.

MembersCurrent membersJason Stollsteimer − lead vocals, lead guitar (1997–2011, 2020–present)
Leann Banks − bass guitar, backing vocals (2006–2011, 2020–present)
Christy Hunt − rhythm guitar, backing vocals (2008–2011, 2020–present)
Don Blum − drums, percussion (1999–2011, 2020–present)Former membersLauren Wilcox − bass guitar (2000–2001)
Carrie Ann Smith − bass guitar, backing vocals (2001–2004)
Yasmine Smith − bass guitar, backing vocals (2004–2006)
Marcie Bolen − rhythm guitar (1997–2006)Touring members'''
Alicia Gbur − rhythm guitar, keyboards, backing vocals (2007–2008)
Matt Lannoo − lead and rhythm guitar (2007–2008)

Timeline

Discography

Studio albums

EPsWe Are Kamikazes (Intheact Records, 2008)

Singles

CompilationsSympathetic Sounds of Detroit LP/CD (Sympathy for the Record Industry, 2001, SFTRI 623)X-Mas Surprise Package Volume 4 7" (Flying Bomb Records, 2001, FLB-118)New Blood – The New Rock N Roll Vol 2 CD (Artrocker, 2002, RRR 33003)X-Ray CD01 (Swinstead Publishing Limited, 2002, CD01)Rough Trade Shops Rock and Roll 2xCD (Mute, 2002, CDStumm 212)The New Rock Revolution CD (NME magazine, 2002, NME CD 02-?)Dim Mak 2003 Sampler CD (Dim Mak, 2003, DM 045)X-Mas Surprise Package (The Collector's Edition) CD (Flying Bomb Records, 2002, FLB-122)Smash Music Sampler CD (Smash Music, 2004, smash 008)Sympathy for the Download 00 CD (Record Collection Music, 2004)House of Wax Soundtrack (Maverick Records, 2005)Rescue Me Soundtrack (Nettwerk Records, 2006)Lost Boys: The Tribe Soundtrack (Adrenaline Records, 2008)

Videography

Music videos

DVDs featuring the Von Bondies
 Later... with Jools Holland: Louder (2003) – features a live performance of "Lack of Communication" from May 2002.
 9 Songs (2004) – features a live performance of "C'mon C'mon" as one of the nine songs.
 In Her Shoes (2005) – features the song "C'mon C'mon".

Media usage
 "C'mon C'mon" is the opening theme used for the FX series Rescue Me.
 "C'mon C'mon" has been used in the PlayStation 2 and Xbox game Burnout 3: Takedown.
 "C'mon C'mon" has been used in the PlayStation Portable game Gretzky NHL.
 "C'mon C'mon" has been used in the MVP Baseball series of video games.
 "C'mon C'mon" is featured as a download for the console game Rock Band/Rock Band 2.
 "C'mon C'mon" has been modified to fit into the video game Tribes: Vengeance on the MTV2 television show Video Mods''.

Interviews
 Love for The Von Bondies – from Torontomusicscene.ca

References

Alternative rock groups from Michigan
Garage rock groups from Michigan
Musical groups established in 1997
Musical groups disestablished in 2011
Sympathy for the Record Industry artists
Sire Records artists
Musical groups from Detroit
1997 establishments in Michigan
2011 disestablishments in Michigan